The RTÉ Radio 1 Folk Awards are annual awards presented by RTÉ Radio 1 to celebrate the best in Irish folk music. The awards were established in 2018 and include recipients such as Martin Hayes, Emma Langford, Declan O'Rourke, Moya Brennan, Andy Irvine, Saint Sister, Steve Cooney, Lisa O'Neill and Lankum.

History

On 1 May 2018 at a launch in Vicar Street, Dublin, RTÉ Radio 1 announced that it would host the inaugural RTÉ Radio 1 Folk Awards at Vicar Street on 25 October of that year, with the event being broadcast live on RTÉ Radio 1 on the night. The RTÉ Radio 1 Folk Awards were to be the first dedicated folk awards held in Ireland, with nine awards categories showcasing and honouring the richness and diversity of folk music talent in Ireland. This would be held in addition to TG4's annual Gradam Ceoil awards, the premier award event in traditional Irish music.

RTÉ Radio 1 later put out a call for designers and craftspeople to design and produce the trophies for the winners at the inaugural RTÉ Radio 1 Folk Awards. The competition invited candidates to create a series of nine commissions, one for each of the awards categories. The purpose of this competition was to promote and highlight the talent and skills of the craft and design sector, and to build a collection of unique awards that reflect the diversity of Ireland's rich talent and heritage through folk music, craft and design. The winner of the commission was invited to discuss their work as part of RTÉ Radio 1's Arena programme. Three candidates were shortlisted based on their work and a statement describing how they would incorporate the heritage of Irish folk music into their design.

The inaugural awards ceremony was hosted in front of a live audience at a packed-out Vicar Street. The visual theme for the awards ceremony was Harvest, inspired by folk heritage, nostalgia and an autumnal palette. The ceremony included performances by artists such as Andy Irvine, Lankum and Saint Sister. In addition to the Vicar Street event, RTÉ Radio 1 produced a five-part feature series on folk music with the support of the Broadcasting Authority of Ireland, which were broadcast in the run up to the awards night.

The Folk Awards has been hosted every year by RTÉ presenters John Creedon and Ruth Smith, and is broadcast live on RTÉ Radio 1 or can be streamed on the RTÉ Radio Player. While the awards ceremony is not broadcast live on television, the entire show is filmed and the highlights can be streamed on YouTube or RTÉ Player. In 2019, highlights from the awards ceremony were televised for the first time, broadcast at a later date on RTÉ One. In 2020, the prizes were announced at a special live event from RTÉ Radio studios, Dublin due to the COVID-19 pandemic and included a special video message from President of Ireland, Michael D. Higgins.

Selection

The nominees shortlist is announced annually in September and is selected by a judging panel of 40 people, among them musicians, promoters, broadcasters, journalists, bloggers and venue owners. The Best Folk Album award is chosen by RTÉ Radio 1 listeners through The John Creedon Show and Simply Folk with Ruth Smith.

Hall of Fame

A posthumous 'Hall of Fame' award is presented annually to celebrate past legends of the Irish folk world.

Inductees
 2021 inductee: Sarah Makem
 2020 inductee: Frank Harte
 2019 inductee: Margaret Barry
 2018 inductee: Tom Munnelly and John Reilly

Award winners

2021
 Best Folk Singer: John Francis Flynn
 Best Folk Instrumentalist: Caoimhín Ó Fearghail
 Best Folk Group: Ye Vagabonds
 Best Emerging Artist: John Francis Flynn
 Best Folk Album: Solas an Lae – Eoghan Ó Ceannabháin and Ultan O'Brien
 Best Original Folk Track: Chain Reaction – Mick Flannery & Susan O'Neill
 Best Traditional Folk Track: I'm a Rover – Ye Vagabonds
 Lifetime Achievement Award: Christy Moore
 Hall of Fame: Sarah Makem

Hosts: John Creedon and Ruth Smith
Venue: Vicar Street, Dublin

2020
 Best Folk Singer: Radie Peat
 Best Folk Instrumentalist: Steve Cooney
 Best Folk Group: Lankum
 Best Emerging Folk Act: Not awarded
 Best Folk Album: Ceol Ársa Cláirsí: Tunes of the Irish Harpers for Solo Guitar – Steve Cooney
 Best Original Folk Track: Baby Talk – Mick Flannery & SON
 Best Traditional Folk Track: Eleanor Plunkett – Steve Cooney
 Lifetime Achievement Award: Steve Cooney
 Hall of Fame: Frank Harte

Hosts: John Creedon and Ruth Smith
Venue: RTÉ Radio studios, Dublin

2019
 Best Folk Singer: Iarla Ó Lionáird
 Best Folk Instrumentalist: Zoë Conway
 Best Folk Group: Ye Vagabonds
 Best Emerging Folk Act: Saint Sister
 Best Folk Album: The Hare’s Lament – Ye Vagabonds
 Best Original Folk Track: Rock the Machine – Lisa O'Neill
 Best Traditional Folk Track: The Foggy Dew – Ye Vagabonds
 Lifetime Achievement Award: Moya Brennan
 Hall of Fame: Margaret Barry

Hosts: John Creedon and Ruth Smith
Venue: Vicar Street, Dublin

2018
 Best Folk Singer: Radie Peat
 Best Folk Instrumentalist: Martin Hayes
 Best Folk Group: Lankum
 Best Emerging Folk Act: Emma Langford
 Best Folk Album: Haven – We Banjo 3
 Best Original Folk Track: Along the Western Seaboard – Declan O'Rourke
 Best Traditional Folk Track: Bean Dubh A’ Ghleanna – Muireann Nic Amhlaoibh
 Lifetime Achievement Award: Andy Irvine
 Hall of Fame: Tom Munnelly and John Reilly

Hosts: John Creedon and Ruth Smith
Venue: Vicar Street, Dublin

See also

 Gradam Ceoil TG4
 BBC Radio 2 Folk Awards
 Scots Trad Music Awards

References

External links

 2020 RTÉ Radio 1 Folk Awards Site
 2019 RTÉ Radio 1 Folk Awards Site
 2018 RTÉ Radio 1 Folk Awards Site
 RTÉ Radio 1's five part feature series

RTÉ Radio 1 programmes
RTÉ Radio 1
Awards established in 2018
Lifetime achievement awards
2018 establishments in Ireland
Folk music awards